Rákospalota, Újpalota, Pestújhely,  15th District the 15th district of Budapest, Hungary.

List of mayors

Sport
The association football club, Rákospalotai EAC, is based in Rákospalota.

Notes

Twin  towns – sister cities
15th district of Budapest is twinned with:

 Dabas, Hungary
 Donji Kraljevec, Croatia
 Liesing (Vienna), Austria
 Linyi, China
  Marzahn-Hellersdorf (Berlin), Germany
 Nad jazerom (Košice), Slovakia
 Obervellach, Austria
 Sanming, China
 Topliţa, Romania

References

External links